Dieudonné Yarga (born February 24, 1986) is a Burkinabé football player who currently plays for ASFA Yennega as a goalkeeper.

Clubs 
2002–present ASFA Yennega

International 
Yarga was member for Burkina Faso at 2003 FIFA World Youth Championship in United Arab Emirates and was member of the 2003 CAN in Egypt & Mali.

References

External links
 Profile on footballdatabase.eu

1986 births
Living people
Burkinabé footballers
Association football goalkeepers
ASFA Yennenga players
Sportspeople from Ouagadougou
21st-century Burkinabé people